Şadan Fişek (28 February 1922 – 23 July 2002) was president of the Association Culturelle Turquie France, a cultural association between France and Turkey and founding member of the Association for Development of Early Childhood Education in Turkey. She received the French Légion d'Honneur in 1989.

References

Recipients of the Legion of Honour
20th-century Turkish women politicians
1922 births
2002 deaths